Strathlene is an area between Buckie and Findochty which has a caravan site facing onto the Moray Firth. At one time the Strathlene House Hotel, a former mansion, was a popular local venue with a pleasant beach leading directly off its lawn. There was also a large outdoor seawater swimming pool which was opened in 1932 situated next to the hotel on the shoreline. Strathlene used to be a popular place to visit for day tourists from the inland towns in the 1930s and 1940s, situated conveniently as it was a mere 300 yards below the Great North of Scotland Railway's Portessie Station and with connecting steps leading down virtually directly from the platform to the seaside. 

The hotel was converted into private accommodation as flats in the late 1970s at around the same time as most of the beach had been eroded by longshore drift. The swimming pool had also been closed some years earlier and Strathlene had become rather faded. 

It is also home to the Strathlene Golf Course 

Villages in Moray